The 2018 North American heat wave affected regions of Canada, where at least 70 deaths in Quebec were heat-related, the United States, where 18 states between Michigan and New Mexico issued heat advisories to a population of over 60 million people, and of Mexico, particularly the northwest and central regions.

Canada

Quebec and Ontario
From June 29 to July 6, 2018, the air temperature consistently rose above  in parts of Quebec and Ontario.

On 4 July, Montreal emergency services reported twelve hundred calls per day about the heat, up 30% from prior busiest days.

As of 10 July, seventy-four people, most of them already ill, had died heat-related deaths in Quebec. This province's death toll is reported as much higher than others' because of its looser rules for attributing death to heat. In Ontario, where only accidental deaths directly caused by heat are counted, the coroner's office is investigating three possible cases.

Maritime provinces
While the heat wave ended on 10 July in Central Canada, this was not so for the Maritimes.  On the 23rd of July, the interaction between a far-northwest Azores-Bermuda High and a trough over Ontario led to the issuing of heat warnings for all three Maritime Provinces, with several locations reporting humidex values in excess of 36. In Halifax, the heat wave contributed to a record-breaking number of hot days in July, with the airport reporting daily high temperatures in excess of 25 °C on twenty-two days that month, breaking the previous record of twenty-one days set in 2008, 2003, and 1924.

Western Canada

British Columbia 
On 8 and 9 August, temperatures reached high levels in Metro Vancouver.

Alberta 

The largest city to break an all-time record was Calgary, with temperatures reaching . Medicine Hat reached , the highest recorded temperature since 1969. Barnwell recorded the highest temperature of  during the heat wave on August 10.

Saskatchewan 
The core heat passed over Saskatchewan on August 10 and 11. Numerous temperature readings above  were recorded across the province including in Assiniboia and Swift Current, which both recorded 2 consecutive days with high temperatures above .

Manitoba 
Numerous daily records were set across Manitoba on August 11 and 12. These were the first  readings in Manitoba since 1989.

United States

California 
The combined conditions of heat and dryness fueled wildfires that caused one fatality and hundreds of evacuations. In Palm Springs the temperature reached .

On 7 July, approximately 34,000 customers of the Los Angeles Department of Water and Power  (about 2.5% of its base) experienced power outages, some for up to 24 hours. The previous day, peak energy-demand set a new record for any July day in the city, at 6,256 megawatts.

On July 23 Palm Springs' temperature reached  again. On July 24 the temperature hit ,  less than its all-time record set in July 1995.

California's state authorities and the California Independent System Operator both urged power conservation by people and business from 5 p.m. to 9 p.m. on July 24 and July 25, 2018. Flex Alerts were issued as the power grid began to overload. The Los Angeles County Department of Public Health also urged people to stay out of the sun on July 24. Thousands lost electricity in California due to sporadic temporary power cuts on July 24 as record temperatures hit the southwestern United States, including much of Arizona and parts of California and Utah.

July 2018 was the warmest July ever in California.

Wildfires
The forest fires that started near the Sequoia and Yosemite National Parks on July 13 grew July 22, 2018. The fires were visible for several miles on the south side of the Mineral King Road and Slapjack Creek, a National Park officials said on July 22. The Atwell-Hockett Trail and the Tar Gap Trail are closed due to the fire, But the Sequoia and Kings Canyon National Parks remain open on July 22. A bulldozer on July 13 and 4 firefighters had died by July 22. More than 2,800 firefighters, a fleet of aircraft and bulldozers had contained only 7% of its perimeter by July 22. An air tanker dropped fire retardant drop on the Horse Creek Fire in Sequoia National Park.

Several fires hit Whiskeytown, California; whilst others expanded past the Sacramento River and into Redding, California on July 28. At least 500 homes, businesses and other structures have been destroyed and 5 died by 28 July.

About 12,000 firefighters battled to contain wildfires in "erratic" winds across northern California on July 29. 6 Californians and 5 others elsewhere had died by June 29.

Arizona
Phoenix, Arizona recorded  on July 24 and 25, 2018 which was lower than the all-time high of  set on June 26, 1990

Colorado 
The record was set in 1878, then matched in 2005 and 2012.

Louisiana

Nevada

Oklahoma

Texas
The temperature in Wichita Falls on July 19 and July 22 reached .

Utah

Mexico
By the end of May 2018, Mexico was already one week into the heat wave. The states of Hidalgo, Chihuahua, Sinaloa, Zacatecas and Jalisco broke historical highs going back more than 50 years. Chihuahua broke its 1978 record temperature and Sinaloa surpassed the high recorded there in 1961. The federal Ministry of the Interior announced that a state of emergency was declared in 573 municipalities in 22 states, and it stated that food and water was being delivered to prevent people from suffering dehydration.

By early June 2018, the Mexican government had declared a state of emergency in more than three hundred municipalities. The extraordinary sales of cold beverages, ice creams, pops and other items popular during hot weather increased to such an extent that Canacope Puebla, a Mexico City business chamber, estimated the nation's GDP would increase by approximately 260 million pesos ($13 mln).

Peak temperatures in July 2018 included: Hermosillo, Sonora, where on July 23 the temperature reached , and Mexicali, Baja California, where on July 23, 24 and 25 the temperature reached .

See also
2018 heat wave
Heat Dome

References 

2018 heat waves
2018 disasters in Canada
July 2018 events in the United States
Heat waves in Canada
Heat waves in the United States